Gooden Airpark (formerly Ridgely Airpark)  is an airport located  northeast of Ridgely, Maryland, United States.

References

External links 
YouTube video at Ridgley

Airports in Maryland
Airports established in 1966
1966 establishments in Maryland